Maaf, Saya Menghamili Istri Anda (Sorry, I've Impregnated Your Wife) is a 2007 Indonesia film written and directed by Monty Tiwa.

The film was banned in Makassar as immoral.

Plot
Maaf, Saya Menghamili Istri Anda is an Indonesian comedy movie. Dibyo is an unemployed actor that obsesses to become a famous actor. He plays in a film, but only as an extra. He also has bad luck with his relationship. His bad luck is changed when he meets Mira, a pretty girl that evidently really likes his style and humor. Their relationship results in Mira becoming pregnant. Mira asked Dibyo to be responsible for the baby. Dibyo is happy and agrees to marry Mira, because finally he has good reason for marrying his sweetheart. However, Mira was still being tied down as someone else's wife, although they are separating the bed.

Cast
Ringgo Agus Rachman
Mulan Kwok
Shanty
Eddie Karsito

References

2007 films
2000s Indonesian-language films
2007 romantic comedy films
Films shot in Indonesia
Indonesian romantic comedy films
Films directed by Monty Tiwa